The 2004 Louisiana Democratic presidential primary was held on March 9 in the U.S. state of Louisiana as one of the Democratic Party's statewide nomination contests ahead of the 2004 presidential election.

Results

See also
 2004 Louisiana Republican presidential primary
 2004 Democratic Party presidential primaries
 2004 United States presidential election in Louisiana

References

Louisiana
Democratic primary
2004